The Jordan–Saudi Arabia border is 731 km (454 mi) in length and runs from the Gulf of Aqaba in the south-west to the tripoint with Iraq in the north-east.

Description
The border starts in the south-west at Gulf at Aqaba, and then consists of nine straight lines that proceed broadly north-eastwards to the Iraqi tripoint. The abruptly concave section of the boundary in the north is apocryphally named "Winston's Hiccup", also referred to as "Churchill's Sneeze" (Arabic: حازوقة وينستون).

History 
At the start of the 20th century, the Ottoman Empire controlled what is now Jordan, with the interior regions further south consisting of loosely organised Arab groupings, occasionally forming emirates, most prominent of which was the Emirate of Nejd and Hasa ruled by the al-Saud family. During the First World War an Arab Revolt, supported by Britain, succeeded in removing the Ottomans from most of the Middle East.

In the period following this, Ibn Saud managed to expand his kingdom considerably, eventually proclaiming the Kingdom of Saudi Arabia in 1932.

As a result of the secret 1916 Anglo-French Sykes-Picot Agreement, Britain gained control of the southern half of the Ottoman Syria Vilayet, with the north going to France (as the Mandate of Syria). The southern half of the vilayet (roughly equivalent to modern western Jordan) was contested between Britain, the newly formed Arab Kingdom of Syria, the Kingdom of Hejaz, and the Zionists in the Mandatory Palestine, resulting in a confused period in which the region was essentially an ungoverned space.

Eventually, in 1921, Britain declared a mandate over the region, creating the Emirate of Transjordan, under the semi-autonomous rule of Emir (and future King) Abdullah I.

The southern border between Transjordan and Arabia was considered strategic for Transjordan to avoid being landlocked, with intended access to the sea via the Port of Aqaba. The southern region of Ma'an-Aqaba, a large area with a population of only 10,000, was administered by OETA East (later the Arab Kingdom of Syria, and then Mandatory Transjordan) and claimed by the Kingdom of Hejaz. In OETA East, Faisal had appointed a kaymakam (sub-governor) at Ma'an; the kaymakam at Aqaba, who "disregarded both Husein in Mecca and Feisal in Damascus with impunity", had been instructed by Hussein to extend his authority to Ma'an. This technical dispute did not become an open struggle, and the Kingdom of Hejaz was to take de facto control after Faisal's administration was defeated by the French. After the 1924–25 Saudi conquest of Hejaz, Hussein's army fled to the Ma'an region (which was then formally announced as annexed by Abdullah's Transjordan). In 1925 Britain and Ibn Saud signed the Treaty of Hadda, which created a border between Jordan and Saudi territory consisting of six straight lines. Crucially, this border gave Transjordan an short outlet on the Gulf of Aqaba. The border was later confirmed by the 1927 Treaty of Jeddah.

In the early 1960s, discussions were held which resulted in a treaty on 9 August 1965; thus creating the current boundary alignment of nine lines, as well as granting Jordan a slightly increased coast (by 18 km) along the Gulf of Aqaba.

'Winston's Hiccup'
The urban myth of the 'Winston Hiccup' arose based on an account of Winston Churchill (then serving as the Secretary of State for the Colonies) boasting in his later years that he had created the British protectorate of Transjordan in 1921 "with the stroke of a pen, one Sunday afternoon in Cairo"; some stories purport that this drawing of the boundary took place following a "particularly liquid lunch".

According to Warren Dockter, it likely stems from “a misquote from Churchill's speech in the House of Commons on 24 March 1936 when Churchill declared, 'The Emir Abdullah is in TransJordania where I put him one Sunday afternoon at Jerusalem.'” Churchill was in Jerusalem for the Cairo Conference between Friday 25 March and Wednesday 30 March 1921; he was to have his first meeting with Abdullah on Monday 28 March. The borders between Transjordan and the Sultanate of Nejd (the predecessor of Saudi Arabia) were not, in fact, discussed at the 1921 Cairo Conference.

In July 1922, Ibn Saud's Wahabi forces took Jauf, and in September Abdullah's forces took Kaf. The hiccup was first sketched out in October 1922 by the Colonial Office during Abdullah's  visit to London. The first formal definition of the boundary between Transjordan and Nejd was the result of negotiations between the British Government and the Sultan of Nejd starting in 1922, negotiated further at the failed 1923-24 Kuwait Conference, and concluded with the Al Hadda Agreement on November 2, 1925. Sir Gilbert Clayton conducted the talks with the sultan as British representative; Churchill had no involvement in the Al Hadda Agreement during which time he was the British Chancellor of the Exchequer.

The “hiccup” resulted from giving the strategic Wadi Sirhan region, and its then primary settlement of Kaf, which had previously been occupied by Abdullah at the urging of the British, to the Sultanate of Nejd. The 1925 treaty did not create the sharp triangular point in the "hiccup" but instead a short north–south segment of 9.3 km along the 37th meridian east.

Kamal Salibi commented about Churchill's pen stroke in The Modern History of Jordan,

Settlements near the border

Jordan
 Mudawwara

Saudi Arabia
 Halat Ammar
 Al Fiyad
 Al Isawiyah
 Qurayyat
 Qullayib Khudr
 An Nabk
 Al-Haditha
 Turaif

Border Crossings
There are currently three official border crossings:
 Umari
 Mudawwara
 Durra Border Crossing

See also

Al Harrah, Saudi Arabia
Al Jawf Province
Amman Governorate
Azraq
British Mandate of Palestine
Geography of Jordan
Jordan-Saudi Arabia relations
Geography of Saudi Arabia
Zarqa Governorate

Bibliography

Notes

External links
Winston's Hiccup in A Jordan travel guide by Matthew Teller
Wadi Sirhan: A New Proposed Trade Route

References

 
Borders of Jordan
Borders of Saudi Arabia
International borders
Emirate of Transjordan
Modern history of Jordan
History of Saudi Arabia
Winston Churchill